Iamblichus (c. 245 – 325) was a Syrian philosopher.

Iamblichus may refer to the following people of ancient Syria:
members of the royal family of Emesa, such as:
 Iamblichus (flourished 2nd century BC), paternal grandfather of Sampsiceramus I
 Iamblichus (phylarch) (died 31 BC), also known as "Iamblichus I", one of the sons of Sampsiceramus I
 Iamblichus II, son of Iamblichus I, Roman client priest king who reigned between 20 and 14 BC
Iamblichus (novelist) (flourished 2nd century), Syrian novelist
Iamblichus of Apameia (flourished 4th century), Syrian philosopher
Saint Iamblichus, one of the legendary Seven Sleepers

Emesene dynasty